Tamasgo may refer to:

Tamasgo, Méguet, Burkina Faso
Tamasgo, Zorgho, Burkina Faso